The Dave and Lynn Frohnmayer Pedestrian and Bicycle Bridge, formerly and still informally known as the Autzen Footbridge, is a bicycle and pedestrian bridge across the Willamette River, located in Eugene, Oregon, in the United States. Named after former University of Oregon president David B. Frohnmayer, the bridge connects Alton Baker Park and Autzen Stadium.

The bridge was originally proposed in 1970 by the Eugene Water & Electric Board (EWEB) to carry steam between EWEB's steam plant and a commercial greenhouse near Autzen Stadium.  The river's bedrock deterred installing a buried pipe. In proposing a bridge, EWEB offered the university and Lane County the option of incorporating a pedestrian bridge if they paid the extra cost.

See also
 Bicycle bridge
 List of crossings of the Willamette River

References

External links
 
 Frohnmayer Pedestrian and Bicycle Bridge, University of Oregon Libraries

Bike paths in Oregon
Buildings and structures in Eugene, Oregon
Bridges in Lane County, Oregon
Bridges over the Willamette River
Concrete bridges in the United States
Pedestrian bridges in Oregon
Transportation in Eugene, Oregon